The Food Trust is a nonprofit organization. It was founded in 1992 by Duane Perry in Philadelphia, Pennsylvania. The current Executive Director is Yael Lehmann. The goal of the organization is to improve the health of children and adults by providing better nutrition. The Food Trust works with neighborhoods, schools, grocers, farmers and policymakers to implement a comprehensive approach to improved food access that combines nutrition education and greater availability of affordable, healthy food. It is currently operating 25 farmer's markets in the Philadelphia region. The markets accept SNAP/food stamps (EBT/Access cards), Farmers’ Market Nutrition Program vouchers and Philly Food Bucks. The Food Trust is funded by private foundations, government grants, and individual donors.

History

In 1992, The Food Trust – then known as The Farmers’ Market Trust - began directing nutrition education classes for inner-city children at Reading Terminal Market, a Philadelphia farmer's market. The organization proceeded to open its first farmer's market at Tasker Homes, a public housing development in the Grays Ferry neighborhood of Philadelphia. Once a week, with the help of the Tasker Homes Tenant Council, the organization's small staff set up one long table of produce. “People hadn’t seen that kind of quality produce in their neighborhood before,” The Food Trust founder Duane Perry recalls. In the two decades since the opening of the Tasker Homes market, The Food Trust has worked with neighborhoods, schools, grocers, farmers and policymakers in Philadelphia and across the country to change public understanding of healthy food and to increase its availability.

Partners

The Food Trust has a private-public partnership with Pennsylvania Fresh Food Financing Initiative (FFFI). Since its launch in 2004, FFFI has funded 83 supermarket projects throughout the state. The $85 million partnership is managed by The Reinvestment Fund. It has provided funding for 88 fresh-food retail projects in 34 Pennsylvania counties, creating or preserving more than 5,023 jobs.

In 2013, the three organizations launched the Healthy Food Access Portal to bring together the rapidly growing body of research, tools, and resources for healthy food access advocates, practitioners, and food system entrepreneurs. This site harnesses data and resources to equip communities with the tools and information needed to successfully plan and implement equitable policies, programs, and projects, as well as to launch innovative food system businesses that improve access to healthy food in low-income communities and communities of color.

The organization also hosts events alongside the Greater Philadelphia Coalition Against Hunger and Philabundance.

Clients
 American Heart Association
 Centers for Disease Control and Prevention
 Community Food Security Coalition
 Dekalb County Board of Health, Georgia
 D.C. Hunger Solutions
 Johns Hopkins Center for a Livable Future
 Mid-Atlantic Dairy Association
 North Penn Community Health Foundation
 Partners for Health Foundation
 Public Health Institute of Metropolitan Chicago
 Robert Wood Johnson Foundation
 Temple University Center for Obesity Research and Education

Markets

 10th & Germantown - 10th Street at Germantown Avenue
 Schuylkill River Park - 25th Street at Spruce Street
 Frankford Transportation Center - Bustleton Avenue at Frankford Avenue
 Kingsessing - 58th Street at Chester Street
 Haddington Friday - 52nd Street at Haverford Avenue
 Strawberry Mansion - North 33rd Street at Diamond Street
 Palmer Park - Frankford Avenue at East Palmer Street
 Norris Square - West Susquehanna Avenue at Howard Street
 Schuylkill River Park - 25th Street at Spruce Street
 Point Breeze - 22nd Street at Tasker Street
 Oxford Circle - Oxford Circle Mennonite Church, 900 East Howell Street
 Broad & Ritner - Broad Street at Ritner Street
 Grays Ferry - 29th Street at Wharton Street
 Fairmount - 22nd Street at Fairmount Avenue
 Broad & South - Broad Street at South Street
 Cecil B. Moore - Cecil B. Moore Avenue at Broad Street
 Overbrook Farms - Overbrook Presbyterian Church, Lancaster Avenue at City Avenue
 Germantown - Germantown Avenue at Walnut Lane
 Clark Park Thursday - 43rd Street at Baltimore Avenue
 Hunting Park - West Hunting Park Avenue at Old York Road
 Haddington Wednesday - 52nd Street at Haverford Avenue
 Olney Transportation Center - Broad Street at Olney Street
 West Oak Lane - Ogontz Avenue at 72nd Avenue
 Cliveden Park - Chew Avenue at Johnson Street
 Headhouse - 2nd Street at Lombard Street

References

Further reading

 
 
 

Food security in the United States
Non-profit organizations based in Pennsylvania
Organizations established in 1992
1992 establishments in Pennsylvania
Hunger relief organizations